Jalapa del Valle is a village in the Mexican state of Oaxaca, some 12 km to the northwest of state capital Oaxaca, Oax.

Populated places in Oaxaca